The Torre Colpatria is a 50-story skyscraper in the downtown area of Bogotá, Colombia. It is the fourth tallest building in the country. The main headquarters of the Colpatria Bank are located in the building, and also a great number of other banks and financial corporations have offices in it. The building lies at the intersection of 26th street and 7th avenue, in the heart of the city's downtown.

Since 1998, the Colpatria Tower was illuminated every night with thirty-six color changing Xenon lights. In 2012, the Dutch lighting company Philips replaced the old lights with a -high LED system to improve the lighting of the building and project high-definition images. Because of that, and also because it was the tallest skyscraper in Colombia for almost 40 years, the building is a landmark in the country and dominates Bogota's skyline along with other structures such as the BD Bacatá, the World Trade Center, FONADE and Colseguros buildings.

Architecture 
The base of the tower is a square, constructed at the juncture of two of the most important avenues in Bogota. The building's facade comprises pilasters of concrete and vertical glazing bars, extending unbroken from ground level to the building's roof. The feature provides ventilation and natural light to offices.

The Torre Colpatria's complex includes a separate ten-floor building, built to give contrast to the main tower's height. There are several public and commercial banking offices, as well as parking facilities.

The tower has an observation deck on the 49th floor, open to visitors on weekends and holidays. Both its central location in Bogota and its height make the Torre Colpatria one of the city's most important observatories.

Stats 
 Height: 
 Floor count: 50
 Top floor: 48
 Capacity : 5.000

Competition 
. 

Since 2005, a tower running race takes place on December 8 to climb the nine hundred eighty steps up, where participants, in groups of ten competitors, start every half minute. The record time is 5 minutes 11 seconds.

See also 

 List of tallest buildings in Colombia
 List of tallest buildings in South America
 BD Bacatá

Gallery

References

External links 

 Emporis.com - Torre Colpatria

Landmarks in Colombia
Skyscraper office buildings in Colombia
Tourist attractions in Bogotá
Buildings and structures in Bogotá
Office buildings completed in 1978